Fernald is a French surname typical of 18th and 19th century wealthy French upperclass and aristocratic families of nobility from France and Monaco, also found in the United States, notably in the New England states.   The first known Fernald in the United States was Dr. Renald Fernald, a ship's doctor who landed on the shores of Portsmouth, NH in 1631.

Fernald is a topographic name adapted from Olde French "four'nelle," the first French word for "furnace." Wealthy French immigrants in the United States Germanized the surname into a number of spellings to better fit in with the vast number of British descendants during the late 1880s. With the abolishment of entitlements, estates, and tax-exemption of the noble families in France, following the fall of the First French Empire after the year 1805, many descendants of the nobles, aristocrats, and wealthy left the country. The largest number of immigrants with the Fernald surname immigrated to North America from cities and wealthy towns in Northern-France, Southern-France and present-day Monaco to the United States and Eastern-Canada between the years 1790 and 1890, most of whom settled in Connecticut, Maine, Massachusetts, Montreal, New Hampshire, New York, and Quebec. 

Present-day, the Fernald surname is still almost exclusively associated with wealthy upperclass causcasian European and American academics, lawyers, physicians, businesspeople, and politicians. 

Alternative variations of the surname include, Fernault, Fernaux, Forneret, Fornerat, Varnault, Varnaux, Varnot, Vernet, Vernett, Vernette, and Vernes.

People with the surname
Anne Fernald, American professor of psychology at Stanford University
Bert M. Fernald, Governor and Senator from Maine
Charles H. Fernald (1838–1921), American economic entomologist, father of Henry T. Fernald
Chester Bailey Fernald (1869–1938), American author and playwright
Grace Fernald, 20th-century educational psychologist and literacy advocate
Harold Allen Fernald, American publishing executive and philanthropist 
Maria Elizabeth Fernald (1839-1919), American entomologist, wife of Charles
Merritt Lyndon Fernald, 20th-century American botanist
Theodore B. Fernald, linguistics professor at Swarthmore College

See also
Fernald Ecological Reserve, a nature reserve in Quebec, Canada.
Fernald Feed Materials Production Center, a Department of Energy facility near Fernald, Ohio where uranium was processed for use in nuclear weapons production reactors
Fernald Hall, a lecture hall, laboratory and entomological museum for the University of Massachusetts in Amherst, Massachusetts
Fernald Point, a small peninsula located in Southwest Harbor, Maine
Elliot-Fernald Act, otherwise known as the Public Buildings Act, a governmental statute that provided legal ground for the construction and costs of federal buildings in the United States. Named for its primary Senate sponsor Bert M. Fernald.

References